The following is a timeline of the history of the city of Cienfuegos, Cuba.

Prior to 20th century

 1494 - Christopher Columbus visited Cienfuegos Bay.
 1745 - Castillo de Jagua (fort) built.
 1819
 April 22: Fernandina de Jagua founded by Luis de Clouet in Spanish colonial Captaincy General of Cuba.
 December: Population: 231.
 1825 - Town "destroyed by a hurricane and rebuilt". 
 1829 - Town renamed "Villa de Cienfuegos."
 1831 - Town coat of arms designed.
 1833 - Our Lady of the Immaculate Conception Cathedral first completed.
 1844 - Governor's house built.
 1880 - Cienfuegos becomes a city.
 1890 - Tomás Terry Theatre opens.
 1892 - Population: 27,430.
 1898
 La Correspondencia newspaper begins publication.
 Two vessels of the United States fleet under Admiral Schley blockaded the port. 
 1899 - Population: 30,038 city; 59,128 district; 356,536 province.

20th century

 1901 - Jardín Botánico de Cienfuegos founded.
 1903
 Roman Catholic Diocese of Cienfuegos established.
 Our Lady of the Immaculate Conception Cathedral became a cathedral.
 1907 - Population: 30,100 city; 70,416 municipality. 
 1911 - Teatro Luisa opens.
 1913 - Tivoli Gardens (theatre) opens.
 1917 - Palacio de Valle (an historic villa) completed.
 1919 - Population: 95,865.
 1933 - Carlos Rafael Rodríguez becomes mayor.
 1935 - Biblioteca Municipal (library) established.
 1939 - Orquesta Aragón dance band formed.
 1957
 Political unrest.
 Naval mutiny at Cienfuegos
 1959 - Armed conflict between government and counterrevolutionaries begins.
 1965 - Armed conflict between government and counterrevolutionaries ends.
 1966 - Population: 89,000.
 1976
 November 2: Municipal election held, the first since 1959.
 Cienfuegos Province established (previously part of Las Villas Province).
 Archivo Histórico Provincial de Cienfuegos (archives) established.
 1980 - Carlos Marx cement plant begins operating.
 1983 - Juragua Nuclear Power Plant construction begins.
 1984 - Population: 107,850 (estimate).
 1999 - Population: 137,513 city; 395,100 province.

21st century

 2005
 July: Hurricane Dennis occurs.
 Historic Centre of Cienfuegos designated an UNESCO World Heritage Site.
 2014 - Population: 149,129.

See also
 Cienfuegos history
 Timelines of other cities in Cuba: Camagüey, Guantánamo, Havana, Holguín, Matanzas, Santiago de Cuba

References

Bibliography

in English
 
 
 

in Spanish
 
 
 
 
  (fulltext)

External links

 Items related to Cienfuegos, various dates (via Digital Public Library of America)
 
 
 Items related to Cienfuegos, various dates (via Europeana)

Cienfuegos
Cienfuegos
Cuba-related lists
Years in Cuba
Cienfuegos